Charlie Bourne (29 October 1906 – 19 January 1958) was an  Australian rules footballer who played with St Kilda in the Victorian Football League (VFL).

Notes

External links 

1906 births
1958 deaths
Australian rules footballers from Victoria (Australia)
St Kilda Football Club players